Cawston was a railway station in Cawston, Norfolk. It was part of the Great Eastern Railway network for a large portion of its existence. It was on the line between County School and Aylsham. It closed in 1952, the station building is now a private residence It can be seen from the Marriott's Way footpath.

References

Disused railway stations in Norfolk
Former Great Eastern Railway stations
Railway stations in Great Britain opened in 1880
Railway stations in Great Britain closed in 1952